Bastards (Svolochi) is a 2006 Russian coming-of-age war film.

Synopsis 
In the Soviet Union, 1943, a group of teenage convicts are secretly trained for a guerrilla mission to stop the actions of a German army group called "Edelweiss".

Plot summary
The story is set in the Soviet Union during the Second World War in the year 1943. Colonel Vishnevetskiy is released from prison to organize a school of military training for saboteurs. Students,14–15 years old criminals, come from prisons and correction colonies. After harsh training they are sent to destroy a German oil depot deep in the Carpathian mountains.

Controversy
The film's release caused massive controversy in Russia, where some deemed it "state-supported anti-Soviet propaganda". The plot for the film, written by Kunin, involved a story of teenagers with a criminal background who were caught by the NKVD during the Great Patriotic war, then trained as saboteurs in special schools and thrown into the German countryside to face a certain death.

After the film was shown in Russia, the Federal Security Service responded with a press-release, stating that archives of security services of Russia and Kazakhstan do not have any documents confirming the existence of "kid saboteur schools", and that there are no archive documents about missions to send saboteur groups consisting of teenagers into the adversary's rear. Although they did state that there are archive documents evidencing the use of kids in saboteur purposes by special services of Nazi Germany.

While the advertising campaign of the film claimed it was based on real accounts, after the controversy arose both the writer and the director confessed the plot was mere fiction.

While the film won the MTV Movie Awards, Russia for 2007, the famous director Vladimir Menshov refused to hand over the award:

Dmitry Puchkov commented on the film making:

Puchkov also sarcastically commented on the information that Russian school students were obligated to watch this film: "Have our children to know the history of the country? Well, now they know it: if anything happens, they would be caught and sent to face certain death."

References

External links

2006 films
2000s Russian-language films
Eastern Front of World War II films
Films about the Soviet Union in the Stalin era
Films based on Russian novels
Films directed by Aleksandr Atanesyan
Films set in 1943
Russian World War II films
Russian coming-of-age drama films
Russian war drama films